Don Featherstone is an Australian filmmaker. His work includes documentaries about significant figures in Australian arts and culture, including authors David Malouf and Tim Winton, artist Brett Whiteley and dancer Robert Helpmann.  Featherstone's works address social and historical issues such as beach culture, The Beach, gangs, The One Percenters about the Milperra Massacre, and war, Kokoda.

Featherstone's satirical mockumentary for television, BabaKiueria, has been the subject of academic comparative analysis of imperial historicity and postcolonial social progress.  It has also been included in cultural exchanges, for example in "Southern Exposure" between the Museum of Contemporary Art, Sydney and the Museum Of Contemporary Art, San Diego.

In 1985 Featherstone cofounded Featherstone Productions with Judy Featherstone.

Featherstone's works have been screened and broadcast internationally, in many countries.

Other filmmakers utilise Featherstone's work, for example James Bogle's Whiteley.

Filmography
Selected works include:
 Food for Thought (1977); writer, director
 Hey Look That's Me (1978);director
 William Cobbett's Rural Rides (1979); director;
 Erte (1979); director;
 The London Programme (1979-1982); director
 The South Bank Show (1982-1985); director
 Ed McBain (1982); director
 Jack Lemmon (1982); director
 John Le Carre (1983); director
 Msistlav Rostropovich (1983); director
 Barry Flanagan (1983); director
 David Hockney (1983); director
 Ivo Pogorelich (1984); director
 Robert Lowell (1984); director
 Alan Bleasedale (1985); director
 The Science of Winning (1985); director
 Arthur Boyd: Figures in the Landscape (1985); director, producer Featherstone Productions; Sydney
 Babakiuerea (1986); director
 Heal or Hoax (1986); director
 Aussies (1987); director
 Beautiful Lies: A Film About Peter Carey (1986); producer, co-writer, director; Featherstone Productions; Sydney
 Dreamtime, Machinetime 1987; director, producer, writer Featherstone Productions; Sydney
 Slow Boat from Surabaya (1988); director
 Creative Spirits (1989); producer, director Featherstone Productions; Sydney
 Difficult Pleasure: A Portrait of Brett Whiteley (1989) producer, director
 Astonish Me, Graeme Murphy (1989); producer
 There's No Time, Peter Sculthorpe (1989); producer
 The Wizard From Oz, James Morrison (1989); producer
 God or Politics', Tom Keneally (1989); producer, director
 The Peoples' Diva', Joan Carden (1989); producer
 Tales of Helpmann (1990); co-producer, director Primetime, Featherstone Productions; Sydney
 Billy Tea and Goulash (1991); director
 The Daylight Moon: A Portrait of the Poet Les Murray (1991); producer, writer, director Featherstone Productions; Sydney
 Fast Forward Exposed (1992); director
 Masterpiece (1992); co-producer, director; SBS, Featherstone Productions; Sydney
 Oondamooroo: Ernie Dingo (1992); director, co-producer
 Eric Rolls: Celebration of the Senses (1992); director, co-producer
 Make It New: Robert Klippel (1992); director, co-producer
 Right Said Fred: Fred Schepisi - Film Director (1993); director, co-producer
 Creative Spirits II (1993); director, producer Featherstone Productions; Sydney
 Lowering the Tone: 45 Years of Robyn Archer (1993); director, producer
 Bon Bons and Roses for Dorothy: Dorothy Hewett 1993; producer
 Dead Quick: Peter Corris 1993; producer
 Lighting Fires: Tim Storrier 1993; producer
 Creative Spirits III (1995); producer, director Featherstone Productions; Sydney
 Tall Tales but True: David Williamson (1994); director, producer
 Smart's Labyrinth: Jeffrey Smart (1994); producer
 The Black Swan: Meryl Tankard Choreographer (1995); producer
 Wrestling The Angel: Blanche D'Alpuget (1995); director, writer, producer
 Dance of Nature: The Music of Ross Edwards (1995); producer, director, writer Featherstone Productions; Sydney
 Young Australian of the Year (1996); writer, director Featherstone Productions; Sydney
 An Imaginary Life: David Malouf: The Inner World of an Extraordinary Writer (1997); writer, director; Linfield, Sydney, AU; Film Australia RM Associates, ABC Television
 The Edge of the World: Tim Winton: Writer (1998); producer; Linfield, Sydney, AU; Film Australia RM Associates, ABC Television
 Art Zone (1998); writer, director
 The Maitland Wonder: Les Darcy (1998); director
 American Journeys (1999); writer, director
 I Witness: The Art of George Gittoes (1999); director, writer, producer Featherstone Productions; Sydney
 It Happened on Holiday (2000); writer, director
 The Beach (2000); coproducer, co-writer, director Centre Coast, Featherstone Productions; Sydney
 Sydney Revealed (2001); writer, director
 Australia Revealed (2002); writer, director
 The One Percenters (2005); writer, director
 Kokoda (2009); writer, director
 Singapore 1942 (2010); writer, director
 The War That Changed Us (2014); writer, co-director
 100 Days to Victory (2018); writer, co-director

Awards and recognition
Film awards and recognition include:

Notes

References

External links
 

Australian documentary filmmakers
Living people
Year of birth missing (living people)
Australian film directors